A Sentimental Attempt is a 1963 Italian  comedy film. It stars actor Gabriele Ferzetti.

It was a Black & White feature film telecast in 1963.

Cast
Fraçoise Prévost: Carla 
Jean-Marc Bory: Dino 
Letícia Román: Luciana 
Giulio Bosetti: Renato 
Barbara Steele: Silvia 
Gabriele Ferzetti: Giulio 
Maria Pia Luzi: Irene 
Marino Masé: Piero

References
2.   https://www.studiocanal.com/title/a-sentimental-attempt-1963/

External links

1963 films
1960s Italian-language films
Films directed by Massimo Franciosa
Films directed by Pasquale Festa Campanile
1963 comedy films
Italian comedy films
1960s Italian films